Brandon James Routh  (born October 9, 1979) is an American actor. He portrayed Superman in the 2006 film Superman Returns, which garnered him international fame. In 2011, he played the titular character of the film Dylan Dog: Dead of Night. He also had a recurring role in the NBC series Chuck, as Daniel Shaw. Routh also has supporting roles in the films Zack and Miri Make a Porno and Scott Pilgrim vs. the World.

In 2014, he was cast in a recurring role as Ray Palmer / The Atom on the TV series Arrow. He later played that role on two other series in the Arrowverse shared universe: The Flash (a guest role) and Legends of Tomorrow (a starring role). Routh also reprised his role as Superman in the 2019 Arrowverse crossover event "Crisis on Infinite Earths". His role on Legends of Tomorrow ended in 2020.

Early life
Routh, the third of four children, was born in Des Moines, Iowa, to Catherine LaVaughn (née Lear), a teacher, and Ronald Ray Routh, a carpenter. He was raised in nearby Norwalk. Routh was raised in a Methodist family, and has English, Scottish, German, and Dutch ancestry.

During his childhood, Routh thought a full-time acting career was unrealistic, citing his small-town background. In his spare time, he played the trumpet and the piano.

Routh attended Norwalk High School, where he played sports, and participated in music and theatre. He attended this school at the same time as Jason Momoa, who would also later become an actor in film adaptations of DC comics. He has described himself as a "momma's boy" and not "the most popular kid" during his school years. Routh has also noted that during his younger years, he was fond of the Superman films and comic books.

Routh attended the University of Iowa for a year, aspiring to be a writer. During this time, he modeled and acted in order to earn his tuition expenses.

Routh has said he was often told that he bore a physical resemblance to Christopher Reeve, who had previously portrayed Superman in a film series. His former manager signed him on because of the resemblance, telling him that he thought Routh would be cast as Superman if there were another film in the series.

Career

Early career
In 1999, Routh left the university  and moved to Manhattan and then Los Angeles, where he pursued a full-time acting career, first appearing as an extra in Christina Aguilera's 1999 music video for "What a Girl Wants". He was cast in his first acting role that same year, in an episode of the short-lived ABC television series Odd Man Out. In 2000, he had a four-episode role on season 3 of MTV's nighttime soap opera Undressed. Routh subsequently appeared on the WB's Gilmore Girls (in a February 2001 episode, "Concert Interruptus", playing a Bangles concert attendee), and earned steady work on the soap opera One Life to Live, playing Seth Anderson from May 23, 2001, until April 17, 2002.

Superman
Prior to Routh's casting as Superman in the film Superman Returns, Warner Bros. had spent over a decade developing a plan to relaunch the franchise, entitled Superman Flyby, with possible stars including actors such as Nicolas Cage, Josh Hartnett, Brendan Fraser, Tom Welling, Paul Walker, Henry Cavill (who eventually became Superman in Man of Steel (2013)), James Marsden, Ashton Kutcher, Keanu Reeves, Will Smith, and James Caviezel, and planned directors including Tim Burton, Wolfgang Petersen, McG, Brett Ratner, and Shekhar Kapur. When director Bryan Singer came aboard the project, however, he insisted an unknown actor be cast in the part, in the tradition of the casting of the best-known film Superman, Christopher Reeve.

Routh, then 24, had previously auditioned for director McG and was spotted by Singer after he viewed Routh's videotaped audition. Singer, who has since stated that Routh was the embodiment of "our collective memory of Superman," was impressed by Routh's resemblance to the comic book icon and found the actor's humble Midwestern roots perfect for the role, as well as his "combination of vulnerability and confidence", which Singer said reminded him of Christopher Reeve. Singer decided to cast Routh after the two met on August 13, 2004, but did not tell Routh until two months later, when Routh's casting was announced in October 2004, making him an "instant celebrity".

Before filming began, Routh bulked up for the role, gaining 22 pounds to reach a high of 218 pounds. Filming for Superman Returns began in Sydney in February 2005. The film was released in the U.S. on June 28, 2006, and earned decent reviews from most critics, but was a box office disappointment, grossing only $200 million in the US compared to its estimated budget of $270 million. Routh was signed on to appear in two potential sequels, but due to mediocre box office results those never materialized.

Reviews of Routh's performance were generally positive, with Newsweek noting he "effortlessly lays claim to the iconic role." On the other hand, film critic Roger Ebert felt that "Routh lacks charisma as Superman, and I suppose as Clark Kent, he isn't supposed to have any."

At the 2006 Spike TV Awards, Routh won the award of "Best Superhero" as Superman in Superman Returns, beating out among others, Hugh Jackman as Wolverine.

In August 2008, Warner Bros. officially announced they intended to reboot the Superman franchise. Routh was still set to reprise the role, according to DC Comics president Paul Levitz. In 2009, however, Routh's contract to play Superman in another film expired, but he said at the time that he would like to return if given the chance. However, British actor Henry Cavill was cast to play Superman in the reboot of the series, Man of Steel.

Subsequent projects

After the release of Superman Returns, Routh signed on to play CIA agent John Clark in Without Remorse, under the direction of John Singleton with a screenplay by Stuart Beattie. Routh would be the third actor to portray the character, after Willem Dafoe and Liev Schreiber. The film was intended for a late-2007/early-2008 release. However, Paramount Pictures put the film into turnaround. Routh's future participation on the project is unknown.

Routh appeared in the independent drama Fling (formerly titled Lie to Me) (2008), co-starring his wife Courtney Ford, and the ensemble film Life is Hot in Cracktown (2009).

Routh was signed to star in The Informers (2009), a film based on Bret Easton Ellis' novel, with Kim Basinger, Amber Heard, and Billy Bob Thornton, but his scenes ended up scrapped with the decision to excise the "vampire" subplot from the film entirely.

At Comic Con 2008, it was revealed Routh was to have a cameo in the Kevin Smith comedy Zack and Miri Make a Porno - he instead appeared as a minor character, Bobby Long - and would serve as a judge on Platinum Studios 2008 Comic Book Challenge. In addition, he has a cameo where he plays himself in the Bollywood film Kambakkht Ishq (2009).

In January 2009, Routh was officially cast to play Todd Ingram in Scott Pilgrim vs. the World which was directed by Edgar Wright, based on the Scott Pilgrim series by Canadian artist Bryan Lee O'Malley. His character is an arrogant, narcissistic bass player who derives psychic powers from his vegan lifestyle, and is the third of the seven Evil Exes the title character must fight.

Routh plays Daniel Shaw in season 3 of spy series Chuck, in a recurring, supporting role. He again played this character in the show's fifth season.

He portrayed supernatural detective Dylan Dog in the 2011 film Dylan Dog - Dead of Night. The film is based on the Italian comic series created by Tiziano Sclavi.

On February 22, 2012, it was announced that Routh had been cast in David Kohan and Max Mutchnick's (the creators of Will & Grace), new CBS half-hour, multicamera comedy pilot, Partners. He played Michael Urie's character's steady partner, alongside David Krumholtz and his Table for Three co-star Sophia Bush.  The series was cancelled after only six episodes had aired.

In 2013, Routh appeared in the video game Call of Duty: Ghosts. Routh has since appeared in one episode of The Millers and multiple episodes of Chosen and Enlisted in 2014.

In 2023, Routh appeared in an episode of Quantum Leap portraying a naval commander: Alexander Augustine.

Arrowverse
On July 7, 2014, it was reported that Routh would once again play a superhero for DC Comics as Ray Palmer / The Atom on The CW's Arrow. He was a recurring character throughout season three, which premiered October 8, 2014.  That same year, he starred in the Hallmark Channel's Christmas-themed movie The Nine Lives of Christmas, which drew good reviews and high ratings.

In January 2015, Arrow co-creator and executive producer Greg Berlanti stated that they were in the midst of "very early" preliminary talks for an additional spin-off series centered on Ray Palmer/The Atom.

In February 2015, it was announced that a spin-off was in development that would co-star Routh as The Atom, along with Arthur Darvill, Wentworth Miller, Victor Garber, and Caity Lotz. The show, Legends of Tomorrow, premiered in January 2016.

Routh reprised his role as Clark Kent / Superman in the 2019–2020 Arrowverse crossover "Crisis on Infinite Earths", 
affected by events adapted from the Kingdom Come storyline. 
His suit was based on the one worn by the storyline's version of the character.
The following month, it was announced that Routh would depart Legends of Tomorrow as a series regular during the fifth season. His final episode as a series regular was "Romeo v. Juliet: Dawn of Justness".

Following such, Routh made two returns to the franchise. First, he returned to Legends for its 100th episode, and to The Flash for the first part of its season eight-opening event "Armageddon". He would then return in the season's eighteenth episode, "The Man in the Yellow Tie".

Personal life

On August 23, 2006, Brandon became engaged to his girlfriend of three years, actress Courtney Ford; the couple married on November 24, 2007, at the El Capitan Ranch in Santa Barbara. In 2012, the couple had a son, Leo James.

Routh's sister, Sara, has a musical track entitled "You're Never Gone" on Sound of Superman, the companion soundtrack of the Superman Returns. Routh is a fan and player of the video game World of Warcraft. During the 2008 Presidential Election, Routh spoke at an Iowa rally in support of Democratic candidate Barack Obama.

Routh is a distant relative of President Franklin D. Roosevelt.

Filmography

Film

Television

Video games

Music videos

Awards and nominations

References

External links

 
 Biography as a Comic Book Challenge judge

Male actors from Iowa
American male film actors
Methodists from Iowa
American people of Dutch descent
American people of English descent
American people of German descent
American people of Scottish descent
American male soap opera actors
American male television actors
Hollywood United players
Living people
University of Iowa alumni
20th-century American male actors
21st-century American male actors
People from Polk County, Iowa
Association footballers not categorized by position
1979 births
Association football players not categorized by nationality